Bee Parish, New South Wales is a rural locality of Cobar Shire and a civil parish of Robinson County.

Geography
The Parish is located on the Barrier Highway between Cubba and Cobar, New South Wales. The Parish is on Buckwaroon Creek has a flat topography and is vegetated by a sparse shrub cover.

References

Parishes of New South Wales
Cobar Shire